Wanted Dead or Alive may refer to:

Film and television 
Wanted: Dead or Alive (1951 film), an American film of 1951
Wanted Dead or Alive (TV series), a 1958–1961 TV series starring Steve McQueen
Wanted: Dead or Alive (1987 film), a sequel to the TV series
Wanted: Dead or Alive (1984 film), a Hindi-language film
"Wanted: Dead or Alive" (Pretty Little Liars), a 2016 episode of Pretty Little Liars

Video game 
Wanted: Dead (2023)

Music

Albums
Wanted Dead or Alive (EP), a 1997 EP by Altamont
Wanted Dead or Alive (David Bromberg album) (1974)
Wanted Dead or Alive (Luni Coleone album) (2002)
Wanted: Dead or Alive (Kool G Rap & DJ Polo album) (1990)
Wanted Dead or Alive (Warren Zevon album) (1969)

Songs
"Wanted Dead or Alive" (Bon Jovi song) (1986)
"Wanted Dead or Alive" (Tupac Shakur and Snoop Doggy Dogg song) (1997)

Other uses
"Wanted dead or alive", a phrase found on wanted posters
Desperados: Wanted Dead or Alive, a video game
Spider-Man: Wanted: Dead or Alive, a 1998 novel

See also
Dead or Alive (disambiguation)